Euricania facialis is a species of insect in the family Ricaniidae. It is found in China (Fujian, Zhejiang, Jiangxi, Henan, Shanxi), Taiwan and Japan.

References

Ricaniidae
Insects described in 1898
Insects of China
Insects of Japan
Hemiptera of Asia